The Indian Story of an Author is a creative nonfiction book written by Gaurav Sharma.

Publication
The first edition of The Indian Story of an Author was published in July 2018 by Think Tank Books.

Synopsis
The book was created out of the frustration of the author when he pitched one of his manuscripts (God of the Sullied) to the publishers in India only to face their rejections on unclear grounds. It only has one brief chapter that summarises the irony of getting published in India with manuscripts other than romance and chick-lit genres. The book is intentionally left blank to express the exasperation of its author on behalf of all other aspiring writers. Sharma's 100 pager book is blank after 13 printed pages, connoting similar trend as seen during the Indian emergency declared by the then prime minister Indira Gandhi when many journalists including Ramnath Goenka left the editorial page of their respective newspapers blank, protesting against the censorship imposed on the press during that time. The Indian Story of an Author was well received in the media and is seen as a symbolic message from the author to all the aspiring writers about the complications of Indian publishing system.

References

2018 non-fiction books
Literary criticism